The City Hall of Osceola, Arkansas, is located at 316 West Hale Street, in the city's central business district.  It is a single-story red brick building with flat roof, built in 1936 by the Works Progress Administration to house the local post office.  The interior lobby space is decorated by a mural entitled "Early Settlers of Osceola", painted in 1939 by Orville Carroll with funding from the Treasury Department's Section of Fine Arts.

The building was listed on the National Register of Historic Places in 1987.

See also
National Register of Historic Places listings in Mississippi County, Arkansas

References

City and town halls on the National Register of Historic Places in Arkansas
Government buildings completed in 1936
Osceola, Arkansas
National Register of Historic Places in Mississippi County, Arkansas
Individually listed contributing properties to historic districts on the National Register in Arkansas
1936 establishments in Arkansas
Post office buildings on the National Register of Historic Places in Arkansas
Works Progress Administration in Arkansas